LSD is the unfinished sixth and final studio album by the English rock band Cardiacs. Recording began in 2005 following several lineup changes, with the lead single "Ditzy Scene" released by Org Records in 2007 to tease the upcoming double album. It was due to be released in October 2008, promoted by singles in August and November as well as a reissue of the concert film All That Glitters Is a Mares Nest (1992). Production was indefinitely postponed after frontman Tim Smith had a cardiac arrest and stroke on 25 June 2008 leaving him unable to play or provide vocals.

Fundraiser gigs, namely a charity concert entitled "The Alphabet Business Convention", were arranged and tribute albums were recorded to aid Smith in rehabilitation and help him to complete work on the album. He died on 21 July 2020 of what was deemed to be another heart attack. The band released "Vermin Mangle", the final track of LSD, on 1 September 2020 to mark his funeral. Originating from Smith's solo performances in 2000 and 2006, it was the first release of new Cardiacs material since "Ditzy Scene". Because of its cancellation, the album became the subject of speculation and many apocryphal stories.

Background and recording 
In October 2005, Smith told questioner Rob Aird that the band had been working on a follow up album to Guns (1999) from "about 1999–2000". Smith also said that "things got broken and we couldn't finish the album", explaining: "I won't re-record things once they have been started because too much of the atmosphere and god knows what else is lost." Smith hinted that the band "might put it out one day as it was left" but confirmed they had moved on to new tracks. A track from the unreleased album called "Faster Than Snakes with a Ball and a Chain" appeared on Greatest Hits (2002). 

Guitarist Jon Poole was replaced by former guitar technician Kavus Torabi in 2003 due to a tight schedule with the Wildhearts. Torabi subsequently played three shows at The Garage, London with Cardiacs performing songs from their early years captured on the two-volume live album The Special Garage Concerts (2005). In 2004, the band's lineup expanded to include vocalists Claire Lemmon and Melanie Woods of Sidi Bou Said, Sharron Fortnam of the North Sea Radio Orchestra, and percussionists Cathy Harabaras and Dawn Staple. Smith had produced for Sidi Bou Said in the past, with Lemmon providing backing vocals for the song "Dog Like Sparky" on Cardiacs' album Sing to God (1996). Staple co-wrote the track "Wireless" with Smith, purportedly a prize for winning a competition set by Cardiacs' label Alphabet Business Concern.

The history page on Cardiacs' website revealed that recordings for LSD began in 2005. On 22 May, Smith noted that his brother bassist Jim Smith "made the strangest noise by accident" which he decided to put on the album. "Ditzy Scene" was the first song written and recorded by the band's new lineup at Smith's own recording studio Apollo 8 in Autumn 2007, shortly before the last Cardiacs tour. Because it was recorded quickly, Torabi had less involvement in the arrangements than for other tracks. He had "never known [Smith] to be as productive as the time [Cardiacs] were making [LSD]."

Promotion and cancelled release 

On 3 November 2007, it was announced by Organ that "Ditzy Scene" would be made available as a limited edition single, two days before it was released by Org Records, the record label associated with the fanzine. The single was heavily pre-ordered, featuring two other new tracks "Gen" and "Made All Up" teasing the LSD double album—their second following Sing to God. On the release, Cardiacs biographer Adrian Bell comments "It's only when you become aware how insular the Alphabet Business Concern is that you realise the high regard they must have for The Organ". The song charted at number 72 on the Spanish iTunes Chart on 11 October 2020. 

The single coincided with a tour. On the tour, Torabi recalled that "The crowds were getting bigger and younger and something was definitely happening", adding that Jim Smith said "something was in the air, that this might be our time." Cardiacs toured until the winter of 2007. In summer 2008, LSD was almost ready and due to be released in October. On 23 June, Cardiacs performed three songs live on Marc Riley's BBC 6 Music radio show. Riley, who confessed a predilection for the band, opined that it was "probably the last time Cardiacs will ever perform." Lemmon, Staple and Sharron Fortnam were no longer in the Cardiacs lineup by then. There were plans for another session, two new singles and a ten-date November tour. On 6 Music, Tim Smith elaborated that the singles would release in August and November along with a DVD reissue of the concert film All That Glitters Is a Mares Nest (1992) in September.

On 25 June, Smith attended the last night of My Bloody Valentine's comeback residency at the Roundhouse in London, and went for a drink with former Cardiacs guitarist Bic Hayes before heading off in the early hours to meet friends. In a north London street, Smith had a cardiac arrest and an episode of cerebral anoxia after being mugged. The mugger, alarmed by Smith's considtion, called an ambulance. Torabi remembers "making up the spare room and going to bed, expecting [Smith] to arrive in a taxi, but he never came." Smith's heart attack triggered a major stroke which was treated in intensive care at University College Hospital, where there was some initial optimism. According to Craig Fortnam, "he was sat up in bed and smiling", but was thought to have had had a second stroke in hospital a few days later as he recuperated, which left him paralysed down one side of the body and unable to speak. He was eventually diagnosed with the rare neurological condition dystonia, which causes muscles to contract uncontrollably. Smith was denied movement and speech, prompting him to retire from live performances. Cardiacs went on an indefinite hiatus following his hospitalisation, leaving LSD unfinished.

Aftermath 
A series of announcements were posted on Cardiacs' website by the band's record label, the Alphabet Business Concern, from 16 July 2008 to 25 June 2009 explaining Smith's current conditions. In a 2009 interview, Torabi said that LSD would eventually release, but it was "the last thing on [their] minds". On 13 December 2010, the tribute album Leader of the Starry Skies: A Tribute to Tim Smith, Songbook 1 was released, compiling covers made by artists close to Smith, members of Cardiacs, and those inspired by the band. Other fundraising initiatives were formed, including gigs—above all the charity concert "The Alphabet Business Convention" held on three occasions between 2013 and 2017. Proceeds from reprints and special editions went towards Smith's rehabilitation, including the 2015 box set The Seaside: Original Edition.

Due to Smith's illness, it was thought that LSD would remain a famous lost album. However, Smith was able to oversee the completion of the Sea Nymphs' second album, On the Dry Land (2016), after significant progress with recovery. Torabi stated in an interview that LSD was "nearly done but needs vocals and eyebrows", adding that there were talks of people who Smith would approve of adding vocals under his direction.  In January 2018, a fundraising drive was launched to help fund Smith's medical bills, initially set at £40,000. The effort was supported by Faith No More founder and bassist Billy Gould, Shane Embury of Napalm Death, Voivod guitarist Dan Mongrain, and Ginger Wildheart. Quickly exceeding the original goal, the JustGiving campaign updated to raise £100,000—enough to provide Smith a year of home care and a chance of recuperation. Later that year, Smith was awarded an honorary degree as Doctor of Music from the Royal Conservatoire of Scotland. There was talk of him moving back to his home full-time and being able to oversee the completion of LSD.

On 22 July 2020, Jim Smith announced in a statement on Cardiacs' website that Tim had died the previous night. The news was confirmed by Torabi, Mary Wren from the Alphabet Business Concern, and another band representative. His exact cause of death was initially unconfirmed, but was deemed to be another heart attack. Tim Smith's funeral was held on 1 September 2020. The same day, the song "Vermin Mangle"—planned as the final track on LSD—was released as a free download on the band's Bandcamp page. It was only played live a few times during Smith's solo performances in 2000 and 2006, with the studio version first shared publicly during Steve Davis' tribute show on Phoenix FM on 30 July. It was their first single and release of new material since "Ditzy Scene" in 2007, featuring the circus, prog and psychedelic instrumentation that drove the band's most classic work.

Notes

References

Sources

2008 albums
Cardiacs albums
Unreleased albums
Unfinished albums